Nicholas Simon Augustine Knowles (born 21 September 1962)  is an English television presenter, writer and musical artist. He is best known for his presenting roles on the BBC, including game shows Who Dares Wins (2007–2019), Break the Safe (2013–2014) and 5-Star Family Reunion (2015–2016). Knowles presents the DIY series DIY SOS (1999–present) for BBC One and co-presented the daytime series Real Rescues (2007–2013).

Early life
Knowles was born in Southall, Middlesex. At the age of 11, Knowles moved to Mildenhall in Suffolk, attending St Louis Middle School and moved again, attended Gunnersbury Catholic School for Boys. After another family move, he attended the Skinners' School in Tunbridge Wells, Kent. 

Leaving school at 16, he had a variety of entry-level jobs, labouring on building sites, working in a petrol station and selling shoes and carpets. He played in bands from the age of 14 and was constantly writing music, poetry and comedy, until he submitted a script to a BBC2 programme that invited children to make a video.

Career

Television
Knowles began as a runner in television production, before moving into presenting. Knowles was a reporter for TVS in the South East, reporting on the nightly news programme Coast To Coast, mostly covering upbeat reports, until TVS lost its contract in 1992. In the early 1990s, he presented a show called Ridge Riders for ITV. This featured a celebrity and another one or two guests riding classic motorcycles along off-road tracks around the UK. The viewer was treated to historic and local information about the locality as well as informal chats with the celebrity. Knowles appeared as a member of Channel 5's  chat show 5's Company between 1997 and 1999.

He is principally known as the main host of DIY SOS, a home renovation series broadcast on BBC One since 1999, and has presented the BBC factual show Real Rescues since 2007. Knowles has also hosted several entertainment programmes for the BBC since signing an exclusive contract with them, including Who Dares Wins, Last Choir Standing, Guesstimation, Secret Fortune and Perfection.

Knowles has also presented programmes with a wildlife theme. In 2007, he fronted Mission Africa, in which a team of volunteers constructed a game reserve in Kenya. During this project, Knowles fell from a Land Rover, dislocating his shoulder. He flew back to the UK to receive emergency treatment. In the same year, he reported on the plight of orphaned orangutans for an edition of Saving Planet Earth. In 2009, Knowles co-presented the BBC reality TV series Wildest Dreams with James Honeyborne, in which novice candidates had to complete a set of challenging tasks filming wild animals in Africa. The winner joined the BBC Natural History Unit on a one-year placement.

From 2011 to 2015, Knowles was the presenter of the BBC game show Perfection, in which the candidates must achieve absolute perfection to win the jackpot, aired weekdays on BBC One.

From 2013 to 2014, he presented the BBC National Lottery game show Break the Safe. In 2015, Knowles began presenting a new BBC One National Lottery game show 5-Star Family Reunion, which returned for a second series in 2016.

In May 2016, Knowles presented Invictus: The Road to the Games, a one-off programme for the BBC.

Knowles earned between £300,000 and £349,999 as a BBC presenter for the financial year 2016–2017.

In 2018 he participated in the eighteenth series of I'm a Celebrity...Get Me Out Of Here!, finishing in sixth place, after being voted out on 6 December.

In May 2021, it was reported that Knowles was holding talks with the BBC regarding his role as the main host of DIY SOS due to his appearance in a Shreddies TV advert which violated BBC's commercial agreements and guidelines. A week later, the BBC announced that they had resolved the issue and Knowles will return to his DIY SOS role with filming to resume in the coming months and is expected to be back on screens in 2022.

During August-September 2021, Knowles will present the Channel 5 series Nick Knowles' Big House Clearout.

Film
Knowles was a co-writer on the film Golden Years, which stars Simon Callow, Virginia McKenna and Una Stubbs. The film was released in the UK on 28 April 2016.

Music
He released his first and last music album, Every Kind Of People, on 3 November 2017. The album entered UK Albums Chart at No. 92.

Personal life
Knowles married his first wife in the 1990s. After separating from her, he lived with presenter Suzi Perry until September 2003, after meeting on set whilst shooting City Hospital for the BBC in 2000. He dated his second wife Jessica Rose Moor from 2009 and they married in September 2012.

In November 2013, Knowles and his wife Jessica opened an antiques shop and home design consultancy in Eton, Berkshire.

Knowles plays rugby. He has been a vegan for a number of years, and, in 2016, became involved with a Shrewsbury-based vegan restaurant called O'Joy. The restaurant closed in November 2017.

Knowles has four children. His brother has a record company and his three sisters all became dancers.

In 2018 Knowles was reported to be living in Spain.

In June 2019, Knowles was issued with a six-month driving ban and fined £1,480 for speeding and using a mobile phone whilst driving. Speaking outside the court in Cheltenham, he said: "For me, this was a wake-up call, and putting my phone in the boot of my car now stops the temptation."

Charity
Nick supports a number of charities including:
2 Wish, Born Free, Centrepoint, Hull4Heroes, Rugby4Heroes, Child Bereavement UK, Childrens Air Ambulance, LEWA Wildlife Conservancy, Little Miracles Peterborough, Surfability, The Yard Edinburgh, Walking with the Wounded, The British Citizen Award.
Knowles has been a regular supporter of the children's anti-bullying charity Act Against Bullying. He sang "Addicted to Love" for Children in Need 2008.

Filmography

Television

Film

Discography

Studio albums

Singles

Music videos

References

External links
  – official site
 

1962 births
Living people
English expatriates in Spain
English game show hosts
English television presenters
I'm a Celebrity...Get Me Out of Here! (British TV series) participants
People educated at The Skinners' School
People from Southall
Television personalities from London